The FL3 (until 2012 FR3) is a commuter rail route. It forms part of the network of the Lazio regional railways, which is operated by Trenitalia, and converges on the city of Rome, Italy.

The route operates over the infrastructure of the Rome–Capranica–Viterbo railway.  Within the territory of the comune of Rome, it plays the role of a commuter railway. It is estimated that on average about 60,000 passengers travel on an FR3 train each day.

The designation FL3 appears only in publicity material (e.g. public transport maps), in the official timetables, and on signs at some stations.  The electronic destination boards at stations on the FL3 route show only the designation "R" and the relevant train number.

Route 

  Viterbo Porta Fiorentina ↔ Roma Ostiense

The FL3, a radial route, runs from Viterbo Porta Fiorentina, north west of Rome, in a south easterly direction, via the Rome–Capranica–Viterbo railway, to Roma San Pietro, and then around the southern side of Rome's city centre to Roma Ostiense.

Stations 
The stations on the FR3 are as follows:
 Viterbo Porta Fiorentina
 Viterbo Porta Romana
 Tre Croci
 Vetralla
 Capranica-Sutri
 Oriolo
 Manziana-Canale Monterano
 Bracciano
 Vigna di Valle
 Anguillara
 Cesano di Roma (limit of urban service)
 Olgiata
 La Storta
 La Giustiniana
 Ipogeo degli Ottavi
 Ottavia
 Roma San Filippo Neri
 Roma Monte Mario
 Gemelli
 Roma Balduina
 Appiano
 Valle Aurelia 
 Roma San Pietro 
 Quattro Venti
 Roma Trastevere  
 Roma Ostiense

Scheduling 
The FL3 route is designated in Trenitalia official timetables as M77 Viterbo–Roma FL3.

, FL3 services operated between Roma Ostiense and Cesano every 15 minutes.  Every second train between Ostiense and Cesano either continues to or originates from Bracciano, and every second train between Ostiense and Bracciano either continues to or originates in Viterbo.  In this way, the Cesano–Bracciano section is served by a train every half-hour in each direction, while Bracciano–Viterbo traffic is served by one train per hour in each direction.

As this section is located within the territory of the comune of Rome ("Roma Capitale"), passengers can travel by purchasing the BIT Metrebus (integrated time ticket), which costs €1.50 for 100 minutes, is valid for one ride on the train, and can also be used on the ATAC public transport network until it expires.

See also 

 History of rail transport in Italy
 List of railway stations in Lazio
 Rail transport in Italy
 Transport in Rome

References

External links
 ATAC – official site 
 ATAC map – schematic depicting all routes in the Rome railway network

This article is based upon a translation of the Italian language version as at October 2012.

Ferrovie regionali del Lazio